Úhlejov is a municipality and village in Jičín District in the Hradec Králové Region of the Czech Republic. It has about 100 inhabitants.

Administrative parts
The village of Chroustov is an administrative part of Úhlejov.

Notable people
Václav Machek (1894–1965), linguist

References

Villages in Jičín District